Dysspastus perpygmaeella is a moth of the family Autostichidae. It is found on Corsica and Sardinia.

The wingspan is 9–10 mm. The forewings are stone-grey, thickly sprinkled with pale greyish fuscous scaling. The hindwings are dull grey.

References

Moths described in 1901
Dysspastus
Moths of Europe